During the 1961–62 English football season, Leicester City F.C. competed in the Football League First Division.

Season summary
In the 1961–62 season, Leicester were England's representatives in the 1961–62 European Cup Winners' Cup as result in reaching the 1961 FA Cup Final the previous season but in the end, the Foxes were knocked out by eventual winners Atlético Madrid in the first round.

In the league, Leicester's challenge never really got going and the Foxes were hovering around mid-table for most of the campaign and finished the season in 14th place.

In the domestic cup competitions, Leicester's efforts ended in disastrous fashion. In the League Cup, the Foxes were beaten by Fourth Division side York City in the second round and in the FA Cup, Leicester lost the third round replay to Stoke City despite having two goals ruled out for offside.

Final league table

Results
Leicester City's score comes first

Legend

Football League First Division

FA Cup

League Cup

European Cup Winners' Cup

Squad

References

Leicester City F.C. seasons
Leicester City